Green Line may refer to:

Places

Military and political 
 Green Line (France), the German occupation line in France during World War II
 Green Line (Israel), the 1949 armistice line established between Israel and its neighbours
 City Line (Jerusalem), part of the Green Line between Israel and Jordan which divided Jerusalem from 1948 and 1967
 Green Line (Lebanon), demarcation line between Christian and Muslim militias in Beirut during the Lebanese Civil War
 Green Line, that part of the United Nations Buffer Zone in Cyprus that runs through Nicosia and a colloquial name for the buffer zone as a whole
 Green Line, part of the GHQ Line defence works built in the United Kingdom during World War II
 Gothic Line, a German defensive line in Italy built during World War II, renamed the "Green Line" in June 1944

Other 
 Green Line (Atlanta development corridor), a development corridor in Downtown Atlanta
 The cities of Virginia Beach, Virginia, and Chico, California each have an urban growth boundary called the "Green Line"

Companies and brands 
 Green Bus Lines, a former transit company in New York City
 "Green Lines", name for former branch of the New York Railways Corporation
 Green Star Line, a former steamship company
 Saturn Aura Green Line, a mild hybrid automobile made by Saturn
 Saturn Vue Green Line, a compact SUV made by Saturn

Transit lines 
Many bus, rail, subway, and tram lines around the world are either officially or colloquially named the "Green Line". These include:

Africa 
 Green Line, part of the Addis Ababa Light Rail system, Addis Ababa, Ethiopa

Asia 
 Green Line (Namma Metro), Bangalore, India
 Green Line (Chennai Metro), Chennai, India
 Green Line (Delhi Metro), Delhi, India
 Green Line (Doha Metro), Qatar
 Green Line (Dubai Metro), United Arab Emirates
 Green Line (Hyderabad Metro), Hyderabad, India
 Green Line (Jerusalem Light Rail), the second line of the Jerusalem Light Rail, Israel
 Green line (Taoyuan Metro), a rapid transit line of the Taoyuan Metro, Taiwan
 Green line (Taichung Metro), Taichung, Taiwan
 Green Line (Taipei Metro), Taipei, Taiwan
 Green Line (Tel Aviv Light Rail), Tel Aviv, Israel
 Green Line, the commuter service of the Tōkyū Tōyoko Line, Yokohama, Japan
 Greenline Express, a city bus company in the Philippines
 Green Line Express, a passenger train operated by Pakistan Railways between Karachi and Islamabad
 Green Line - Karachi Metrobus, a bus rapid transit line under construction in Karachi, Pakistan
 Line 8 (Beijing Subway), Beijing, China
 Line 4 (Guangzhou Metro), Guangzhou, China
 Kwun Tong line, Hong Kong, China
 Line 2 (Shanghai Metro), Shanghai, China (light green)
 Line 12 (Shanghai Metro), Shanghai, China (dark  green)
 Chūō Line (Osaka), Japan
 Tokyo Metro Chiyoda Line, a line in Tokyo, Japan
 Yokohama Municipal Subway Green Line, a subway line in Yokohama, Japan
 Manila Light Rail Transit System Line 1, Manila, Philippines
 Dzerzhinskaya Line, Novosibirsk, Russia
 East West MRT line, Singapore
 Seoul Subway Line 2, South Korea
 Dark Green line, Bangkok, Thailand
 Light Green line, Bangkok, Thailand
 Rangkasbitung Line of KRL Commuterline, Jakarta, Indonesia

Australia 
 Line T8 of the Airport & South Line, Sydney, Australia

Europe 
 Green Line (Lisbon Metro), one of the four lines of Lisbon Metro
 Line A (Prague Metro), Prague, Czech Republic
 M1 (Copenhagen), Copenhagen, Denmark
 Lyon Metro Line D, Lyon, France
 RER D, Paris, France
 Line 4 (Budapest Metro), Budapest, Hungary
 Green Line (Luas), one of the two tram lines in Dublin, Ireland
 Line M2 - Milan Subway (Metropolitana di Milano), Milan, Italy
 Line C of the Porto Metro, Porto, Portugal
 Green Line, a route of the TOMA, Caldas da Rainha, Portugal
 Bucharest Metro Line M4, Bucharest, Romania
 Zamoskvoretskaya line, Moscow, Russia
 Nevsko-Vasileostrovskaya Line, Saint Petersburg, Russia
 Barcelona Metro line 3, Barcelona, Spain
 Line 5 (Madrid Metro), Madrid, Spain
 Green Line (Stockholm Metro), Sweden
 Alekseevskaya Line, Kharkiv, Ukraine
 Syretsko–Pecherska line, Kiev, Ukraine
 Green Line Coaches, a commuter coach network in London, United Kingdom
 Green Line route 724, a bus service in the outskirts of London
 Green Line route 797, a former bus service between Hatfield and London
 Green Line routes X1 and X10, a former bus route in Southwest England
 District line, London, UK
 Green Line, one of the two lines in the Tyne and Wear Metro, Northeast England, UK
 Green Line Coach Station, a bus station in London, United Kingdom

North America

Canada 
 Green Line (Calgary), a light rail line in Calgary, Alberta, Canada under construction
 Line 2 Bloor–Danforth, a rapid transit line of the Toronto Subway, coloured green on system maps
 Evergreen Extension (TransLink), an extension of an existing rapid transit line in Vancouver, British Columbia
 Green Line (Montreal Metro), a rapid transit line in Montreal
 Viva Green, a rapid bus transit line in York Region, Ontario
 Green Line, a bus route of the WEGO Niagara Falls Visitor Transportation system, Niagara Falls, Ontario

United States 
 Green Line (Baltimore), a proposed transit line in Baltimore, Maryland
 Green Line (CTA), Chicago, Illinois
 Green Line (MARTA) (formerly the Proctor Creek Line), Atlanta, Georgia
 Green Line (MBTA), a light rail system in Boston, Massachusetts
Green Line A branch, a streetcar line branch of the Green Line
Green Line B branch, a light rail branch of the Green Line
Green Line C branch, a light rail branch of the Green Line
Green Line D branch, a light rail branch of the Green Line
Green Line E branch, a streetcar branch of the Green Line
Green Line Extension, an initiative to expand transit services in Greater Boston, Massachusetts
 Green Line (Miami Metrorail), Miami, Florida
 Metro Green Line (Minnesota), a light rail line in Minneapolis-St. Paul, Minnesota
 Southwest LRT, a proposed expansion of the Green Line
 Green Line (Sacramento RT), a light rail line in Sacramento, California
 Green Line (San Diego Trolley), a light rail line in San Diego, California
 Green Line (Washington Metro), Washington, D.C. and Prince George's County, Maryland
 Green Line (RTA Rapid Transit), based in Cleveland and Shaker Heights, Ohio
 Warm Springs/South Fremont–Daly City line, a BART rapid transit line San Francisco
 C Line (Green), Los Angeles, California, a light rail line in the Los Angeles Metro system
 D Line (RTD), Denver, Colorado
 MAX Green Line, Oregon
 Green Line, a bus route of the First Coast Flyer, Jacksonville, Florida
 Green Line, a San Bernardino Express bus rapid transit line in San Bernardino
 Rapid Ride, Route 777 "Green Line", a bus rapid transit service in Albuquerque, New Mexico
 IRT Lexington Avenue Line in New York City, colored green, serving 
 IND Crosstown Line, in New York City, colored lime green, serving 
 Green Line, a route of the Emerald Express, Eugene, Oregon
 SEPTA subway–surface trolley lines, Philadelphia, Pennsylvania
 Greenline (Pennsylvania), a proposed transit line in southeastern Pennsylvania
 Green Line (Capital Metro), a proposed expansion of Capital MetroRail, Austin, Texas
 Green Line (Dallas Area Rapid Transit), a light rail line in Dallas, Texas
 Green Line, former name of the Trinity Railway Express, Dallas, Texas
 Green Line (TRAX), Salt Lake City, Utah
 Green Line (Sound Transit), Seattle, Washington
 Swift Green Line, a planned bus rapid transit line in Snohomish County, Washington
 Green Line (Pittsburgh), Pittsburgh, Pennsylvania
 Green Line (VTA), a light rail in Santa Clara County, California
 Shelby Farms Greenline, a 10-mile (16 km) rail trail passing through Shelby Farms, a large park in Memphis, Tennessee

South America 
 Green Line, portion of the Mi Teleférico cable car transit system in La Paz, Bolivia
 Line 2 (São Paulo Metro), São Paulo, Brazil

Road transportation
 Green Belt (Pittsburgh), Pittsburgh, Pennsylvania

Other uses 
 An underground sanitary sewer in the American Public Works Association utility location color code
 Art on a Green Line, the name of a 2015 art exhibition at Carleton University, Ottawa, Canada
 Green Line Rivalry, an athletic rivalry between Boston College and Boston University
 Green Stripe, a 1905 drawing by Henri Matisse
 Operation Greenline, Second World War

See also 
 Yellow Green Line (disambiguation)
 Light Green Line (disambiguation)
 Teal Line (disambiguation)
 Yellow Line (disambiguation)